Vazhvile Oru Naal is a 1956 Indian Tamil-language film, directed by A. Kasilingam and produced by U. R. Jeevarathnam. The film stars Sivaji Ganesan, G. Varalakshmi, Sriram and Rajasulochana. It was released on 21 September 1956.

Plot

Cast 
Sivaji Ganesan as Kannan/Bai
G. Varalakshmi as Janaki/Kaladevi
Sriram as Muthu/Murugan
Rajasulochana as Lakshmi
V. K. Ramasamy as Vazhavanthan
Friend Ramasamy as Sokkalingam
M. Santhanam as Drama Company Owner
Thirupathysamy as Gajapathy

Soundtrack 
The music was composed by C. N. Pandurangan, T. G. Lingappa & S. M. Subbaiah Naidu. Lyrics were by Ku. Sa. Krishnamoorthy, T. K. Sundhara Vathiyar, K. S. Gopalakrishnan and Kavi C. A. Lakshmana Dass.

References

External links 
 

1956 films
1950s Tamil-language films
Films scored by T. G. Lingappa
Films scored by S. M. Subbaiah Naidu
Films scored by C. N. Pandurangan